Government Polytechnic Nagariya Mod Etah is a government technical institute in Uttar Pradesh, India. This college is also known as Government Polytechnic Etah. It is affiliated with the Uttar Pradesh Board of Technical Education, falling under the West Zone (Daurala Merrut). It is also approved by the All India Council for Technical Education. The college was established in 2013 and initially operated at Government Polytechnic Soron Kasganj; it moved to Etah district in 2015. Most students come from the Purvanchal region of northern India.

Diploma

Government Polytechnic Etah offers diplomas in the following subjects:

Civil engineering
Mechanical engineering
Electrical engineering

References

Technical universities and colleges in Uttar Pradesh
Etah
Educational institutions established in 2013
2013 establishments in Uttar Pradesh